Eggertsville is a hamlet and census-designated place (CDP) within the town of Amherst in Erie County, New York, United States. The population of the CDP was 15,019 at the 2010 census.

Eggertsville is part of the Buffalo–Niagara Falls Metropolitan Statistical Area.

Geography
Eggertsville is located at  (42.96314, -78.80364), in the southwestern corner of the town of Amherst, directly adjacent to the northeast corner of the city of Buffalo. As delineated by the U.S. Census Bureau, the northern boundary of the CDP is New York State Route 324, and the eastern boundary is formed by Getzville Road and Berryman Drive. The southern and western borders of the CDP follow the town boundary of Amherst.

New York State Route 5, Main Street, passes through the CDP, leading southwest to the center of Buffalo and east towards Williamsville in the town of Amherst.

References

External links
Eggertsville-Snyder Branch, Buffalo & Erie County Public Library

Hamlets in New York (state)
Census-designated places in Erie County, New York
Census-designated places in New York (state)
Buffalo–Niagara Falls metropolitan area
Hamlets in Erie County, New York